Athanasios 'Thanasis' Kartsabas (born 3 June 1997) is a Greek professional footballer who plays as a midfielder.

Personal life
In addition to his football career, he is a professional Dota 2 player.

References

1997 births
Living people
Dota players
Greek footballers
Super League Greece 2 players
Gamma Ethniki players
Pierikos F.C. players
Association football midfielders
Footballers from Katerini
AO Chania F.C. players